Mekaal Hasan Band (sometimes shortened to MHB) is an international sufi rock band formed in Lahore, Pakistan in 2000 by composer, singer-songwriter and guitarist Meekal Hasan.

The band members have roots in different genres, including pop, rock music, soul music, and black rock, the combination of each member has created a sound which has earned them fans from a variety of quarters.

History

Early years (1995–2004) 
Songwriter Mekaal Hasan, born in Lahore, Pakistan, was surrounded by music since childhood. His mother was a Christian and father, Masood Hasan, a Muslim, passionate for jazz music who influenced him throughout his early years. After graduating from Government College, Lahore, Mekaal studied music at the Berklee College of Music, Boston, and his stay there exposed him to a wide variety of music and musicians, many of whom are influences on him to this day. His parents encouraged him to come back to Lahore, Pakistan by offering to build him a studio. So he returned to Lahore in 1995. After some initial hard struggle, Mekaal Hasan had a big musical breakthrough in Pakistan in 2004.

In March 2001, Mekaal collaborated with Pete Lockett in a series of concerts countrywide featuring music written for Pete and classical artists by Mekaal.

Mekaal Hasan has worked with many other fellow-musicians like Ali Azmat, Atif Aslam, Jal Band, Noori, Zeb and Haniya, Meesha Shafi, Poor Rich Boy, Fareed Ayaz and Abu Mohammad Qawwal and many more musicians.

Pepsi Battle of the Bands
The band entered the first season of the music television series Pepsi Battle of the Bands, in an effort to win the competition and earn a lucrative album deal from Pepsi. The band finished third, behind Aaroh and Entity Paradigm who finished first and second respectively.

Sampooran (2004–2008) 
Mekaal Hasan Band released their debut album, Sampooran, in 2004 through EMI/Virgin Records.

Saptak (2009–2010)
Mekaal Hasan Band, released their second album in October 2009. They also released their video of a single "Chal Bulleya" on 2 October 2009.

On 3 February 2010, the band's vocalist Javed Bashir decided to part ways after working along with the band for 8 years. On 26 December, in an online poll by Dawn, the band's video for their single, "Chal Bulleya", was voted as the best music video of 2010.

Andholan (2014)
Mekaal Hasan Band's latest album featuring the all new lineup was released September 2014 in Pakistan and India across iTunes, Taazi, Amazon Music, and other platforms. Mekaal Hasan Band released just one video from a live performance of the track "Ghunghat". Despite being a live performance, it won song of the year in The Express Tribunes Critics Choice and in the reader polls, and was also declared 2014's song of the year by Dawn. The album was removed from GIMA Awards for having "foreign roots", although the album featured Indian vocalist Sharmistha Chatterjee in all the songs.

Discography
Studio albums
 Sampooran (2004)
 Saptak (2009)
 Andholan (2014)

Band members
Current
 Mekaal Hasan – lead guitar (2001–present)
 Mohammad Ahsan Papu – flute (2001–present)
 Sharmistha Chatterjee – lead vocals (2013–present)
 Sheldon D'Silva – bass (2013–present)
 Gino Banks – Drummer (2013–present)

Former
 Riaz Ali Khan – lead vocals (2001–2002)
 Sameer Ahmed – bass guitar (2001–2009)
 Asad Abbas – lead vocals (2010–2011)
 Javed Bashir – lead vocals (2002–2010,2011–2013)
 Amir Azhar – bass (2009–2013)
 Kami Paul – Drummer (2012–2013)

Timeline

See also 
 List of Pakistani music bands

References

External links
long review

Musical groups established in 1999
Pakistani musical trios
Pakistani rock music groups
Pakistani musical groups
Musical groups from Lahore
World music groups
1999 establishments in Pakistan
Jam bands